Villa Heights may refer to:

 Villa Heights, Virginia
 Villa Heights, Roanoke, Virginia
 Villa Heights, Charlotte, North Carolina